The Women's 1 km race event of the 2015 UCI BMX World Championships was held on 25 July 2015.

Results

Motos

Quarter finals

Semi finals

Final

References

Women's race
UCI